The Mali records in swimming are the fastest ever performances of swimmers from Mali, which are recognised and ratified by the Fédération Malienne de Natation.

All records were set in finals unless noted otherwise.

Long Course (50 m)

Men

Women

Short Course (25 m)

Men

Women

References

Mali
Records
Swimming